Max Perlich (born March 26, 1968) is an American film and television actor. In 1990, Perlich won the Independent Spirit Award for Best Supporting Male for his performance in the hit indie film Drugstore Cowboy and was nominated for the same award in 1996 for his performance in Georgia.

Early life
Perlich was born in Cleveland, Ohio. His mother was actress Linda Porter, known for her roles in shows such as Superstore and Gilmore Girls, and his father, Martin Perlich, was a writer, radio programming director and announcer, who worked for a time with the Cleveland Orchestra. The Perlich family moved to Los Angeles, California when Max was four.

Career 
After Perlich dropped out of high school in 10th grade, his career began with a small part in John Hughes' hit 1986 teen comedy Ferris Bueller's Day Off. He then began appearing in a series of bit parts on television and in teen films such as Can't Buy Me Love (1987), Plain Clothes (1988), Gleaming the Cube, Lost Angels and Drugstore Cowboy (1989). He was also in the films Rush (1991), The Butcher's Wife (1991), Cliffhanger (1993), Maverick (1994), Shake, Rattle and Rock! (1994),
Georgia (1995), Beautiful Girls (1996), Homeward Bound II: Lost in San Francisco (1996) House on Haunted Hill (1999), and Blow (2001). He had a recurring role as J. H. Brodie on Homicide: Life on the Street (1997). He also had recurring roles on television series such as Buffy the Vampire Slayer (1998), Gilmore Girls (2001), Charmed (2005), My Name Is Earl (2006), and Terminator: The Sarah Connor Chronicles (2008), in addition to appearing in an episode of Season 4 of Burn Notice (2010). He is also featured in the music videos "Bust a Move" by Young MC, "No Excuses" by Alice in Chains and "Naked Eye" by Luscious Jackson.

Filmography

Film

Television

References

External links

1968 births
Living people
20th-century American male actors
21st-century American male actors
American male film actors
American male television actors
Independent Spirit Award for Best Supporting Male winners
Male actors from Cleveland